All Saints’ Church, Pentewan is a Grade II listed parish church in the Church of England in Pentewan, Cornwall.

History

The church was built in 1821 by Sir Christopher Hawkins, 1st Baronet as part of a scheme to improve Pentewan village.
The church is painted a yellow colour inside with a number of pews and an electric organ.

Parish status

The church is in a joint parish with
Holy Trinity Church, St Austell
St Levan’s Church, Porthpean

References

Pentewan
Pentewan
Churches completed in 1821